Adrian Cann (born September 19, 1980) is a Canadian soccer player who plays as a defender for Canadian Soccer League club Serbian White Eagles FC.

Career

College
Cann had a college soccer career at the University of Louisville from 2000 to 2003. Cann immediately earned a place in the Cardinals' starting lineup as a freshman, starting 20 games for the team, and was named to first-team All-Conference USA. Cann would maintain this level of performance, being named first-team All-C USA as a sophomore, junior, and senior, and being named the conference's Co-Defensive Player of the Year as a junior and senior. In his final year he played 15 games for them. In 2002, he played with the York Region Shooters in the Canadian Professional Soccer League, and made his debut on May 23, 2002 against the Mississauga Olympians.

Cann is a member of the University of Louisville Athletics Hall of Fame.

Professional
Upon graduating, Cann was selected 16th overall in the 2004 MLS SuperDraft by Colorado Rapids. Cann played little for the team, however, and was released midseason because of roster restrictions limiting a team's international players. Cann then signed late in the season with Montreal Impact, but saw little playing time for the team, playing only 256 minutes over 7 games. He stayed with the Impact for the 2005 season and made 15 more appearances for them.

In 2006, Cann signed with Vancouver Whitecaps, helping the team win their first USL First Division Championship beating the Rochester Raging Rhinos 3-0 and was named the Whitecaps' Most Outstanding Defender in 2007.

On June 29, 2008 he signed a four-year deal with Danish football side Esbjerg fB. He was released from his contract in early 2010.

Cann underwent a trial with League Two Burton Albion in England before agreeing to a trial with Toronto FC of Major League Soccer in March 2010.

Cann signed with Toronto FC on April 12, 2010 after ongoing trials with the team. He made his debut for the club against Philadelphia Union April 15, 2010. Since joining fellow international Nana Attakora in the centre of defence the Canadian partnership has become one of the strongest in the league. On September 21, 2010 Cann had a stand out performance which saw him win Man of the Match against highly rated Mexican side Cruz Azul in the 2010 CONCACAF Champions League Group Stage, the game finished as a 0–0 away draw. This game was also the first time in which Adrian had the honour of wearing the captain's armband for Toronto since Dwayne De Rosario was on the bench. On November 18, Adrian was awarded the team's most valuable player of the 2010 season, taking the honour from captain Dwayne De Rosario who won the award in the 2009 season.

Following pre-season camp in Turkey and Orlando it was announced by the club on March 2, 2011 that Cann had not traveled with the team to Charleston, South Carolina for the Carolina Challenge Cup. This following Cann's rejection of a new contract offer in which he wanted to continue to negotiate, all deals were removed from the table leading Cann to retire or wait for Toronto to cancel the remaining years on his current contract. However eight days later the club announced that Cann had rejoined the team in Charleston with just over a week before the first regular season game. After a strong early 2011 season from Cann, on May 31 he tore his ACL during a practice on a turf field with the team. Coach Aron Winter confirmed that he would miss the remainder of the 2011 league season.

Cann made his return from injury on April 14, 2012 against Chivas USA, the game ended in a 1–0 home loss for Toronto.

Cann was released by Toronto on November 15, 2012. He subsequently entered the 2012 MLS Re-Entry Draft and became a free agent after going undrafted in both rounds of the draft.

On January 22, 2014, it was announced that Cann had signed with North American Soccer League club San Antonio Scorpions. In 2016, he returned to Canada to sign with Scarborough SC of the Canadian Soccer League, where he made his debut on August 8, 2016 against FC Ukraine United. He recorded his first goal on October 9, 2016 in 2–1 defeat to the Serbian White Eagles FC. In total he appeared in 8 matches and recorded 1 goal. He also appeared in the 2017 Canadian Soccer League final playing the full 120 minutes in a penalty shootout loss to the York Region Shooters 

He then played for the Mississauga MetroStars in the Major Arena Soccer League in 2018-19. In 2021, he returned to the CSL to play with the Serbian White Eagles. He re-signed with Serbia for the 2022 season.

International 
He made his debut for Canada in a January 2008 friendly match against Martinique. Cann was also chosen in the 23-man roster for the 2009 CONCACAF Gold Cup where Canada won Group A with seven points before being knocked out by Honduras in the quarter-finals. His last cap came in 2011, earning him a total of nine caps, two of which were FIFA World Cup qualification matches.

Cann represented Canada at the 2017 CONCACAF Beach Soccer Championship.

Post-playing career 
After retiring he became a real estate agent. In 2020, he became involved with a group looking to found a professional soccer team in Peterborough, Ontario to play in League1 Ontario. The team became known as Electric City FC, with Cann hoping to serve as the team's head coach after retiring.

Career statistics

Honours

Montreal Impact
A-League Championship (1): 2004
A-League Eastern Conference Championship (1): 2004
USL First Division Commissioner's Cup (1): 2005

Vancouver Whitecaps
USL First Division Championship (1): 2006

Toronto FC
Canadian Championship (3): 2010, 2011, 2012

Individual
Toronto FC Player of the Year: 2010
 2002 Conference USA Co-Defensive Player of the Year
 2002 First Team All-Conference USA
 2002 Team Most Valuable Player
 2002 Team Most Valuable Defensive Player
 2002 NSCAA second team All-Great Lakes
 2001 Conference USA Co-Defensive Player of the Year
 2001 First Team All-Conference USA
 2001 Team Most Valuable Player
 2001 Team Most Valuable Defensive Player
 2001 NSCAA second team All-Great Lakes
 2000 First Team All-Conference USA
 2000 Conference USA All-Freshman Team
 2000 NSCAA second team All-Great Lakes

References

External links

 
 
 
 Profile at Model Resource
 

1980 births
Living people
People from Thornhill, Ontario
Association football defenders
Soccer people from Ontario
Canadian soccer players
Canadian beach soccer players
Canada men's international soccer players
2009 CONCACAF Gold Cup players
Canadian expatriate soccer players
Canadian expatriate sportspeople in the United States
Canadian expatriate sportspeople in Denmark
Canadian people of Jamaican descent
Canadian people of Slovak descent
Louisville Cardinals men's soccer players
York Region Shooters players
Colorado Rapids players
Montreal Impact (1992–2011) players
Vancouver Whitecaps (1986–2010) players
Esbjerg fB players
Toronto FC players
San Antonio Scorpions players
Scarborough SC players
Serbian White Eagles FC players
USL First Division players
Danish Superliga players
Major League Soccer players
Expatriate soccer players in the United States
Expatriate men's footballers in Denmark
A-League (1995–2004) players
Colorado Rapids draft picks
North American Soccer League players
Canadian Soccer League (1998–present) players
Major Arena Soccer League players
Mississauga MetroStars players